Les Horribles Cernettes ("The Horrible CERN Girls") was an all-female parody pop group, self-labelled "the one and only High Energy Rock Band", which was founded by employees of CERN and performed at CERN and other HEP-related events. Their main claim to fame is that a photograph of them was one of the earliest photographic images shared on the world wide web. 

Their musical style is often described as doo-wop. The initials of their name, LHC, are the same as those of the Large Hadron Collider, which was later built at CERN. Their humorous songs are freely available on their website.

History
Les Horribles Cernettes was founded in 1990 by Michele de Gennaro, a graphic designer at CERN, whose romantic relationship with a physicist was made difficult by his numerous shifts. She attracted attention by stepping on stage during the CERN Hardronic Festival, singing "Collider", a melancholy song about the lonely nights endured by the girlfriend of a high energy physicist.

The group was subsequently formed with the help of Silvano de Gennaro, an analyst in the Computer Science department at CERN, who wrote additional songs. The fame of Les Horribles Cernettes grew and they were invited to international Physics conferences and The World '92 Expo in Seville, as well as celebrations such as Georges Charpak's Nobel Prize party. At the same time the band self-released an album titled Collider through CD Baby and received press coverage from numerous newspapers, including The New York Times, The Herald Tribune, La Tribune de Genève, and the CERN Courier.

The band's lineup has changed over time, but they were performing under the same name until 21 July 2012, when the band had its final performance, which was at CERN's Hardronic Festival in Switzerland.

The band went into hiatus when Silvano and Michele moved away from the CERN area and officially disbanded in late July 2012, after performing at the CERN Hardronic Festival on the 21st. Lynn Veronneau has since embarked upon a serious solo career, recording French language versions of popular standards. Angela Higney also made several solo releases.

On July 15, 2017, and in celebration of their 25th anniversary (of their historic exposure on the World Wide Web), the original members performed for a one-time-only concert in Geneva.

In May 2020 the band released a new song titled "The Lockdown Song" referencing to the events of COVID-19 pandemic.

First photo on the web
Les Cernettes is the subject of the first photo of a band and one of the first photos on the Web:

Silvano had taken the picture above on July 18, 1992 with a Canon EOS 650.

Discography

Collider (album)

Track listing

Singles
 "The Lockdown Song" - 2020

Other songs
The song performed at the CERN Hardronic '98 festival:
 "Goodbye Sweet CERN"
New 2007 songs presented for the first time in the CERN 2007 Hardronic festival:
 "Big Bang"
 "Mr. Higgs"

Music videos

See also
 Trojan Room coffee pot
 "Large Hadron Rap" by Katherine McAlpine
 Filk music

References

External links 
Les Horribles Cernettes Home Page
Cernettes Band Profile on YouTube
The CERN MusiClub

 Band history and evolution

Filkers
History of the Internet
Girl groups
CERN
Swiss musical groups
Musical groups established in 1990